Buck Connors (November 22, 1880 – February 4, 1947) was an American actor. He appeared in more than 80 films between 1912 and 1941. He is the son of William L Conner and Leah Bowen. He was born in Streator, La Salle County, Illinois, and died in Quartzsite, Arizona., and is buried in Hi Jolly Cemetery in Quartzsite.

Selected filmography

 The Phantom Riders (1918)
 The Black Horse Bandit (1919)
 The $1,000,000 Reward (1920)
 Action (1921)
 Outlawed (1921)
 The Duke of Chimney Butte (1921)
 In the Days of Buffalo Bill (1922)
 Tracked to Earth (1922)
 The Social Buccaneer (1923)
 Fighting Fury (1924)
 The Back Trail (1924)
 Ridin' Thunder (1925)
 Hidden Loot (1925)
 The Radio Detective (1926)
 The Ridin' Rascal (1926)
 The Yellow Back (1926)
 The Fighting Three (1927)
The Broncho Buster (1927)
 The Mojave Kid (1927)
 Straight Shootin' (1927)
 Jaws of Steel (1927)
 The Phantom Flyer (1928)
 The Fearless Rider (1928)
 Hell's Heroes (1930)
 The Lone Rider (1930)
 Headin' for Trouble (1931)
 Trails of Danger (1931)
 Desert Vengeance (1931)
 Alias John Law (1935)
 West of the Santa Fe (1938)

References

External links

1880 births
1947 deaths
American male film actors
American male silent film actors
20th-century American male actors
Male actors from Texas